The Antonov An-218 was a proposal by the Antonov Design Bureau for a widebody commercial airliner. A twin-engined design, it was intended to carry approximately 350 passengers.

The first flight was initially scheduled for 1994. Due to severe economic conditions the project was abandoned.
Only a full-scale wooden replica of the An-218 was built, but eventually it was disassembled.

Specifications (An-218-100, as designed)

See also

References

External links

 Aircraft facts (translated) (original page)
 An-218 airliner by Antonov ANTK

An-218
1990s Ukrainian airliners